Transition region may refer to:

 Solar transition region
 Filter transition region